Arthur Bihannic (born 7 August 1933) is a French former professional racing cyclist. He rode the 1956 Tour de France.

References

External links
 

1933 births
Living people
French male cyclists
Sportspeople from Brest, France
Cyclists from Brittany